Ilima-Lei Macfarlane (born April 2, 1990) is an American professional mixed martial artist currently competing in the flyweight division of Bellator MMA. She is the inaugural and former Bellator Women's Flyweight World Champion. As of December 13, 2022, she is #6 in the Bellator Women's pound-for-pound Rankings and #3 in the Bellator Women's Flyweight Rankings.

Background
In her youth, Macfarlane played basketball, but her aspirations in the sport came to a stop due to series of knee injuries. Macfarlane graduated Punahou School in 2009 in Honolulu, Hawaii. Although she got a scholarship for wrestling to Menlo College, she decided to study Anthropology at San Diego State University from where she earned Bachelor Degree in 2013. After earning her Bachelor Degree in 2013, she continued her education at SDSU to study Master of Arts in Liberal Studies.

During the summer before grad program, she decided to lose some weight she gained in the college and joined a CrossFit gym and Liz Carmouche's MMA gym. She grew affinity for mixed martial arts and continued training at the San Diego Combat Academy.

Personal life
In April 2020, Ilima-Lei, her sister Mahina, and one other female who chose to remain anonymous to the public filed a lawsuit against Punahou School for failing to take action over years of alleged sexual abuse from the school's assistant basketball coach, Dwayne Yuen. In the lawsuit, all three allege Yuen of years of sexual abuse, harassment, lewd gestures, and showing young girls several pornographic photos.

Mixed martial arts career

Xplode Fight Series
Macfarlane began her amateur MMA career in 2014. She fought five times during that year, mainly with Xplode Fight Series, and went undefeated as an amateur.

Macfarlane's first professional fight was an unsanctioned match against Katie Castro for Xplode Fight Series in 2015. Macfarlane won via technical knockout ten seconds into the bout. In the aftermath of the lopsided affair, the California State Athletic Commission (CSAC) launched an investigation into the organization's unsanctioned MMA events. Castro had a 0-2 record before fighting Macfarlane and footage of the match was posted on the internet and labeled "Soccer mom loses to MMA fighter". The video went viral, garnering over a million views on YouTube and was discussed on a few television news networks.

Bellator MMA
Following the bout with Castro, Macfarlane signed a three-fight contract with Bellator MMA. She made her debut in August 2015 at Bellator 141 where she defeated Maria Rios by split decision.

Macfarlane fought Amber Tackett at Bellator 148 where Macfarlane won by armbar submission in the first round.

Macfarlane's next bout was against Rebecca Ruth at Bellator 157 where she won by standing rear-naked choke in the second round.

Macfarlane would then fight Emily Ducote at Bellator 167 where she was victorious via unanimous decision.

Macfarlane faced Jessica Middleton at Bellator 178 and won by armbar submission in the first round.

Bellator Women's Flyweight World Champion
Macfarlane and Emily Ducote had a rematch at Bellator 186 for the inaugural Bellator Women's Flyweight World Championship. Macfarlane won the bout with an armbar variation in the fifth round to win her first MMA championship.

Macfarlane faced Alejandra Lara at Bellator 201 for the first defense of her flyweight title. Macfarlane won the fight in the third round via armbar.

Macfarlane faced Valérie Létourneau at Bellator 213 in Macfarlane's hometown of Honolulu, Hawaii. Macfarlane successfully defended her title for a second time, defeating Létourneau by third round submission.

In her third title defense, Macfarlane faced Veta Arteaga at Bellator 220 on April 27, 2019. She won the fight via TKO due to a doctor's stoppage in the third round.

Macfarlane made her fourth title defense against Kate Jackson at Bellator 236 on December 21, 2019. Macfarlane was victorious via unanimous decision.

On February 10, 2020, it was announced that Macfarlane had signed a ten-fight, five-year extension contract with Bellator.

Macfarlane attempted her next defense against undefeated challenger Juliana Velasquez on December 10, 2020 at Bellator 254. She lost the fight and her title via unanimous decision.

Post Title Reign 
After more than a year off due to knee surgery and rehab, Macfarlane made her return against Justine Kish on April 23, 2022 at Bellator 279. In an upset, she lost the bout via unanimous decision.

Macfarlane faced Bruna Ellen at Bellator 284 on August 12, 2022. At weigh ins, Macfarlane was three pounds over the division non-title fight limit at 129 lbs, resulting in her being a fined a percentage of her purse which went to Ellen and the bout proceeded at catchweight. She won the bout via unanimous decision.

Macfarlane is scheduled to face Kana Watanabe on April 22, 2023, at Bellator 295.

Championships and accomplishments

Combat jiu-jitsu
Eddie Bravo Invitational
 Combat Jiu-Jitsu Women's Flyweight Championship (One time, inaugural)

Mixed martial arts
Bellator MMA
Bellator Women's Flyweight World Championship (One time, inaugural)
Four successful title defenses
 Second most submission wins in Bellator history (6) - tied with Michael Chandler and Neiman Gracie
Most wins in Bellator amongst women (10)
Most stoppage wins in Bellator amongst women (7)
Most wins in Bellator Flyweight division history (10)
Most fights in Bellator Flyweight division history (10)
MMAjunkie.com
2018 Breakthrough Fighter of the Year

Mixed martial arts record

|-
|Win
|align=center|12–2
|Bruna Ellen
|Decision (unanimous)
|Bellator 284
|
|align=center|3
|align=center|5:00
|Sioux Falls, South Dakota, United States
|
|-
| Loss
| align=center|11–2
| Justine Kish
|Decision (unanimous)
| Bellator 279
| 
| align=center|3
| align=center|5:00
| Honolulu, Hawaii, United States
|
|-
|Loss
|align=center|11–1
|Juliana Velasquez
|Decision (unanimous)
|Bellator 254
|
|align=center|5
|align=center|5:00
|Uncasville, Connecticut, United States
|
|-
|Win
|align=center|11–0
|Kate Jackson
|Decision (unanimous)
|Bellator 236
|
|align=center|5
|align=center|5:00
|Honolulu, Hawaii, United States
|
|-
|Win 
|align=center| 10–0
|Veta Arteaga
|TKO (doctor stoppage)
|Bellator 220
|
|align=center|3
|align=center|1:50
|San Jose, California, United States 
|
|-
| Win
|align=center| 9–0
|Valérie Létourneau
| Submission (triangle choke)
|Bellator 213
|
|align=center|3
|align=center|3:19
|Honolulu, Hawaii, United States
|
|-
| Win
| align=center| 8–0
| Alejandra Lara
| Submission (armbar)
| Bellator 201
| 
| align=center| 3
| align=center| 3:55
| Temecula, California, United States
|
|-
| Win
| align=center| 7–0
| Emily Ducote
| Submission (triangle armbar)
| Bellator 186
| 
| align=center| 5
| align=center| 3:42
| University Park, Pennsylvania, United States
|
|-
| Win
| align=center| 6–0
| Jessica Middleton 
| Submission (armbar) 
| Bellator 178
| 
| align=center| 1
| align=center| 2:15
| Uncasville, Connecticut, United States
|
|-
| Win
| align=center| 5–0
| Emily Ducote 
| Decision (unanimous)
| Bellator 167
| 
| align=center|3
| align=center|5:00
| Thackerville, Oklahoma, United States
|
|-
| Win
| align=center| 4–0
| Rebecca Ruth 
| Submission (standing rear-naked choke)
| Bellator 157
|  	
| align=center| 2
| align=center| 3:00
| St.Louis, Missouri, United States
|
|-
| Win
| align=center| 3–0
| Amber Tackett 
| Submission (armbar)
| Bellator 148
|  
| align=center| 1
| align=center| 2:09
| Fresno, California, United States
|
|-
| Win
| align=center| 2–0
| Maria Rios 
| Decision (split) 
| Bellator 141
| 
| align=center| 3
| align=center| 5:00
| Temecula, California, United States
|
|-
| Win
| align=center| 1–0
| Katie Castro
| KO (punches)
| Xplode Fight Series – Hurricane
|  
| align=center|1
| align=center|0:10
| Valley Center, California, United States
|
|-

|-
|Win
|align=center|5–0
| Angela Hancock
| Submission (armbar) 
|Xplode Fight Series - Wasteland
|
|align=center|3
|align=center|1:32
|Valley Center, California, United States
|
|-
|Win
|align=center|4–0
| LaToya Darby 
| TKO (punches) 
|Xplode Fight Series - Tornado
|
|align=center|1
|align=center|0:50
|Valley Center, California, United States
|
|-
|Win
|align=center|3–0
| Breanna Bland 
| Submission (kimura) 
|Xplode Fight Series - Tidal Wave 
|
|align=center|1
|align=center|1:47
|Valley Center, California, United States
|
|-
|Win
|align=center|2–0
| Monique Martinez 
| Decision (split)
|Archangel Worldwide MMA – Tournament of Truth 2
|
|align=center|3
|align=center|2:00
|Riverside, California, United States
|
|-
|Win
|align=center|1–0
|Stephanie Houser
|Submission (rear-naked choke)
|Xplode Fight Series - Fire 
|
|align=center|1
|align=center|0:46
|Valley Center, California, United States
|
|-

Combat jiu-jitsu record

See also
 List of current Bellator fighters
 List of current mixed martial arts champions
 List of female mixed martial artists
List of Bellator MMA champions

References

External links
 
 

1990 births
Living people
American practitioners of Brazilian jiu-jitsu
Female Brazilian jiu-jitsu practitioners
American female mixed martial artists
Mixed martial artists from Hawaii
Flyweight mixed martial artists
Mixed martial artists utilizing wrestling
Mixed martial artists utilizing Brazilian jiu-jitsu
Bellator female fighters
Bellator MMA champions
Punahou School alumni
San Diego State University alumni
Sportspeople from Honolulu
21st-century American women